Summer City is an unincorporated community that sits on the border of Bledsoe County, and Rhea County, Tennessee, United States.  It lies between the cities of Pikeville (the county seat of Bledsoe County) and Dayton (The county seat of Rhea County), at the intersection of Tennessee State Route 30 and Tennessee State Route 443 (New Harmony Road).

References

Unincorporated communities in Bledsoe County, Tennessee
Unincorporated communities in Tennessee